Marco De Luca (born 12 May 1981 in Rome) is an Italian race walker. His best results at International level are 7th place at 2009 World Championships and 6th at 2006 European Championships and 2010 European Championships.

But the most prestigious achievement of his career was achieved in 2016, at age 35, when he finished fourth at the World Race Walking Team Championships, but was awarded the bronze medal following the disqualification for doping of the teammate Alex Schwazer, who had won the gold medal.

He competed at the 2020 Summer Olympics in 50 km walk.

Biography
Marco De Luca won three times the individual national championship. At London 2017 for him it is the seventh consecutive participation in the World Championships. He also participated at three editions of the Summer Olympics from 2008 to 201 and four consecutive editions (2006, 2010, 2014, 2018) of European Championships (in the editions of the European Championships of the Olympic years, 2012 and 2016, the race walk was not part of the program).

Achievements

National titles
Italian Athletics Championships
20 km walk: road: 2011
50 km walk: road: 2006, 2009

See also
 Italy at the European Race Walking Cup - Multiple medalists
 Italian all-time lists - 50 km walk

References

External links
 

1981 births
Living people
Athletes from Rome
Italian male racewalkers
Athletes (track and field) at the 2008 Summer Olympics
Athletes (track and field) at the 2012 Summer Olympics
Athletes (track and field) at the 2016 Summer Olympics
Olympic athletes of Italy
World Athletics Championships athletes for Italy
Athletics competitors of Fiamme Gialle
Athletes (track and field) at the 2020 Summer Olympics